Fabio Fognini was the defending champion but decided not to participate.
Martin Kližan won the title after defeating Leonardo Mayer 6–3, 6–1 in the final.

Seeds

Draw

Finals

Top half

Bottom half

References
 Main Draw
 Qualifying Draw

AON Open Challenger - Singles
AON Open Challenger
AON